Beneath Still Waters is a 2005 horror film directed by Brian Yuzna.  It stars Michael McKell, Raquel Meroño and Charlotte Salt.  It was based on a novel by Matthew Costello.

Plot
Studying under a disciple of Aleister Crowley, the leader of an upper class group invokes a supernatural force that slowly devours the village of Marienbad and its inhabitants, threatening to spread beyond its geographical limits. The mayor from the town nearby commissions the building of a dam which would flood the valley in 1965 and therefore submerge the village forever sealing the evil force under water after the leader and his followers were incapacitated to be kept from escaping. However, fate ensured the leader's freedom as he remained in the depths when the waters covered Marienbad. Now in 2005, 40 years later an array of disappearances and deaths in mysterious circumstances are threatening the town next to the reservoir that now covers Marienbad.

Cast
 Michael McKell as Dan Quarry
 Raquel Meroño as Teresa Borgia
 Charlotte Salt as Clara Borgia
 Patrick Gordon as Mordecai Salas
 Manuel Manquiña as Luis
 Omar Muñoz as 10-year-old Luis
 Pilar Soto as Susana
 Diana Peñalver as Mrs. Martín
 Ricard Borràs as Mayor Luca
 Damià Plensa as Antonio
 David Meca as Diver Sargent Eduardo
 Carlos Castañón as Police Captain Keller
 Josep Maria Pou as Julio Gambine

Additionally, Axelle Carolyn appears a partygoer. Javier Botet, in his film debut, portrays as a humanoid creature.

Production
It was produced in Catalonia. The film is the ninth and last film to be produced by Filmax's Fantastic Factory label. It is based on the novel Beneath Still Waters by Matthew J. Costello.

Release
The film premiered on 24 October 2005 as part of the San Sebastián Horror and Fantasy Film Festival, followed with Spain theatrical release on 26 May 2006.  It was released on DVD in the US on 9 April 2007.

Reception
Steve Barton of Dread Central rated it 1/5 stars and called it a "poorly assembled, laughably bad, absolute waste of time".  Annie Riordan of Brutal as Hell rated it 1/5 stars and wrote that the film does not live up to the potentially interesting premise.  David Johnson of DVD Verdict wrote that it has good scenes but criticized the overreliance on poor CGI and tedious character development on unlikeable characters.  At DVD Talk, Scott Weinberg rated it 2/5 stars, and Paul Mavis rated it 1.5/5 stars; both called it derivative of earlier horror films.  Writing in The Zombie Movie Encyclopedia, Volume 2, academic Peter Dendle said, "The human dimensions of the story don't connect well, but the underwater scenes are visually very appealing."

References

External links

2005 films
2005 horror films
2000s mystery films
2000s thriller films
British zombie films
Spanish zombie films
Spanish thriller films
2000s English-language films
English-language Spanish films
2000s Spanish-language films
Films based on American horror novels
Films shot in Madrid
Films directed by Brian Yuzna
Films scored by Zacarías M. de la Riva
2005 multilingual films
British multilingual films
Spanish multilingual films
2000s British films